Kuttika Kaewpin (born August 16, 1994 in Nakhon Pathom) is a Thai indoor volleyball player. She is a current member of the Thailand women's national volleyball team.

Club 
  Saijo-denki Nakornnonthaburi (2011–2018)
  Jakarta Pertamina Energi (2015)
  Jakarta Electric PLN (2016)
  Creamline Cool Smashers (2017–2019)
  3BB Nakornnont (2020-2021)
  Nakhon Ratchasima (2021–present)

Awards

Individuals
 2012 Asian Junior Championship – "Best Scorer"
 2018–19 Thailand League – "Best Scorer"
 2018–19 Thailand League – "Best Outside Spiker"
 2018–19 Thailand League – "Best Server"

Clubs 
  2011 Women's Volleyball Thailand League –  Champions, with Nakornnonthaburi Volleyball Club
  2012–13 Women's Volleyball Thailand League –  Runner-up, with Nakornnonthaburi Volleyball Club
  2015 Women's Volleyball Thai-Denmark Super League –  Runner-up,  with Nakornnonthaburi Volleyball Club
  2016 Indonesian Women's Proliga –  Champions, with VW Jakarta Elektrik PLN
  2017 Premier Volleyball League Reinforced Conference –  Bronze medal, with Creamline Cool Smashers
  2017 Women's Volleyball Thai-Denmark Super League –  Bronze medal, with Nakornnonthaburi Volleyball Club
  2018 Premier Volleyball League Reinforced Conference –  Champions, with Creamline Cool Smashers
  2018 Women's Volleyball Thai-Denmark Super League –  Bronze medal, with Nakornnonthaburi Volleyball Club
  2018-19 Women's Volleyball Thailand League –  Bronze medal, with Nakornnonthaburi Volleyball Club
  2019 Premier Volleyball League Reinforced Conference –  Runner-up, with Creamline Cool Smashers
  2019 Women's Volleyball Thai-Denmark Super League –  Bronze medal, with Nakornnonthaburi Volleyball Club

References

External links
 FIVB Biography

1994 births
Living people
Kuttika Kaewpin
Kuttika Kaewpin
Kuttika Kaewpin
Kuttika Kaewpin